Sedrakyan is an Armenian surname. Notable people with the surname include:

 Nairi Sedrakyan (born 1961), Armenian mathematician
 Sedrak A. Sedrakyan (born 1950), Armenian psychologist
 Vardan Sedrakyan (born 1967), Armenian epic poetry expert

Armenian-language surnames